A number of motor vessels were named Antonios or similarly, including:

 , a Greek coaster in service 1954–57
 , a Greek coaster in service 1963–69

Ship names